Nazlu-e Shomali Rural District is in Nazlu District of Urmia County, West Azerbaijan province, Iran. At the National Census of 2006, its population was 16,373 in 4,288 households. There were 15,538 inhabitants in 4,719 households at the following census of 2011. At the most recent census of 2016, the population of the rural district was 15,316 in 4,772 households. The largest of its 62 villages was Khaneqah Sorkh, with 1,789 people.

References 

Urmia County

Rural Districts of West Azerbaijan Province

Populated places in West Azerbaijan Province

Populated places in Urmia County